In linear algebra, Weyl's inequality is a theorem about the changes to eigenvalues of an Hermitian matrix that is perturbed.  It can be used to estimate the eigenvalues of a perturbed Hermitian matrix.

Weyl's inequality about perturbation

Let  and  be n×n Hermitian matrices, with their respective eigenvalues  ordered as follows: 

Then the following inequalities hold:

and, more generally,

In particular, if  is positive definite then plugging  into the above inequalities leads to

Note that these eigenvalues can be ordered, because they are real (as eigenvalues of Hermitian matrices).

Weyl's inequality between eigenvalues and singular values 
Let  have singular values  and eigenvalues ordered so that . Then

Applications

Estimating perturbations of the spectrum 

Assume that  is small in the sense that its spectral norm satisfies  for some small . Applying Weyl's inequality, it follows that the spectra of the Hermitian matrices M and N are close in the sense that

Note, however, that this eigenvalue perturbation bound is generally false for non-Hermitian matrices (or more accurately, for non-normal matrices). For a counterexample, let  be arbitrarily small, and consider  

whose eigenvalues  and  do not satisfy .

Weyl's inequality for singular values 
Its singular values  are the  positive eigenvalues of the  Hermitian augmented matrix

Therefore, Weyl's eigenvalue perturbation inequality for Hermitian matrices extends naturally to perturbation of singular values. This result gives the bound for the perturbation in the singular values of a matrix  due to an additive perturbation :

where we note that the largest singular value  coincides with the spectral norm .

Notes

References

 Matrix Theory, Joel N. Franklin, (Dover Publications, 1993) 
 "Das asymptotische Verteilungsgesetz der Eigenwerte linearer partieller Differentialgleichungen", H. Weyl, Math. Ann., 71 (1912), 441–479

Diophantine approximation
Inequalities
Linear algebra